Goudi Olympic Complex is a sports complex in Athens, Greece. It held two of the sports venues used during the 2004 Summer Olympics.

Goudi Olympic Hall

Olympic Modern Pentathlon Centre

Post-Olympics development 
The Goudi Olympic Complex is now the site of the ultra-modern Badminton Theater, which hosts major theatrical productions (e.g., West Side Story, Romeo and Juliet).

References

2004 Summer Olympics official report. Volume 2. pp. 265, 367.

Badminton venues
Venues of the 2004 Summer Olympics
Sports venues in Greece
Olympic Parks